Hermann Keck (1919 – 2010) was a German scientist who invented the Keck Clip.

Keck was born in Treysa and has two patents on his name:

 Clip for fixing male and female parts of ground glass joints, (1984).
 Handled clamp for ground glass ball and socket joints or the like, (1988).

References 

20th-century German chemists
1919 births
2010 deaths
People from Schwalmstadt
20th-century German inventors